The BMW 303 was a small family saloon produced by BMW in 1933 and 1934. It was the first BMW motor car with a six-cylinder engine and the first BMW motor car with the "kidney grille" associated with the brand. The platform developed for the 303 was used for several other BMW cars, including the BMW 309, a four-cylinder version of the 303, the BMW 315, a 1.5-litre version of the 303 which replaced it in 1934 and was built until 1937, the BMW 319, a 1.9-litre version of the 303 produced alongside the 315 from 1935 to 1937, and the BMW 329, a development of the 319 with styling based on the newer, larger BMW 326, that briefly replaced the 319 in 1937.

The 303 platform was also used for the BMW 315/1 and BMW 319/1. These were high-performance versions of the 315 and 319 respectively, with tuned engines and lightweight roadster bodywork.  The 315/1 and 319/1 were replaced by the BMW 328 in 1936.

Design, engineering, and styling

Chassis and suspension
Upon its introduction in 1933, the 303 was the largest car BMW had made. Unlike the 3/20's backbone chassis, the 303 had a ladder frame made from tubular side members and box-section cross members.

The independent front suspension used a transverse mounted leaf spring mounted above the wheel centre line. The hubs were located with  the spring mounts at the top and control arms at the bottom.  The rear suspension used a live axle on semi-elliptic leaf springs, a conventional system neither as advanced nor as troublesome as the 3/20's swing axles.

The 303 was the first German car in its size and price class to have automatic "one-shot" chassis lubrication. Each wheel had a drum brake; all four were operated through the pedal using rods and levers, while the rear brakes were also operated by cables from the handbrake lever.

Engine

The 303 was the first BMW car to use a straight-6 engine.  The M78 1182 cc six-cylinder engine was developed from the four-cylinder engine used in the 3/20.  The engine had the same bore and stroke as the four, but the bore spacing was increased to allow for further increases in bore and to provide for crankshaft bearings between the ends of the crankshaft.  The crankshaft ran in four plain bearings.

Styling
The 303 was the first BMW to use the 'kidney grill', which has since become a defining feature of the company's models.

Two-door saloon and cabriolet bodies were manufactured, at first by Daimler-Benz's coachworks in Sindelfingen, and later by Ambi-Budd in Berlin.  Ambi-Budd would also offer a two-seat sports cabriolet for the 303.

Reception
At the time it was being made, the 303 was the least expensive six-cylinder car in Germany. The combination of soft spring rates at the front and hard spring rates at the rear caused understeer, body roll, and a generally unsettling pitching movement. 2300 BMW 303s were produced up to 1934, when the 303 was replaced by the 315.

Models developed from the 303

309

The BMW 309 was a development of the 303. A replacement for the 3/20, the 309 was a 303 with a four-cylinder engine developed from the M78 six-cylinder engine used in the 303.

In addition to the body styles offered with the 303, the 309 was also available as a tourer.

With the same body as the 303, the 309 offered the same amount of room at a lower cost and a lower tax rating based on its smaller engine.  The 309 was manufactured from 1934 to 1936, with a total of 6,000 made.

Six-cylinder successors: 315, 319, and 329

The 315 replaced the 303 in 1934.

The 319 were introduced in 1935.

Upon the introduction of the BMW 326 in 1936, the 315 and 319 were no longer BMW's largest cars.

The 315 and 319 were discontinued in 1937. A total of 9,765 BMW 315s were built, including two-door saloon cars, touring cars, convertibles, sport convertibles, and 315/1 roadsters. A total of 6,646 BMW 319s of all types were built by the end of production in 1937.

The 329 replaced the 319 in early 1937.  The 329 was basically a 319 with the front bodywork and fenders from the BMW 326.  The 329 was available only as a convertible, with either two or four doors.  The 329 was replaced by the 326-based BMW 320 later in 1937.

315/1 and 319/1 roadsters

The BMW 315/1 was a sports car based on the 315 saloon. It used the same chassis as the 315 saloon and had an engine of the same displacement.

The BMW 319/1 was a 1.9-litre version of the 315/1 introduced alongside the 319 in 1935.

Production of the 315/1 and 319/1 roadsters ended in 1936, with 242 of the 315/1 roadsters and 102 of the 319/1s built.  The 315/1 and 319/1 were replaced by the BMW 328, which was based on an all-new tubular steel ladder frame, but used the steering gear and suspension of the 319/1.

References

Citations

Bibliography

Carfolio web pages:

303
Cars introduced in 1933